Wikstroemia trichotoma is a shrub in the family Thymelaeaceae.  It is evergreen, and is found in eastern Asia, specifically Anhui, Guangdong, Guangxi, Hunan, Jiangxi, and Zhejiang.

Description
The shrub grows to a height of 0.5 to 2.5 meters.  It flowers during the summer, and grows at an altitude of around 600 meters.

References

trichotoma